A by-election was held in the British House of Commons constituency of Christchurch on 29 July 1993 following the death of sitting Conservative MP Robert Adley.

The result was a gain for the Liberal Democrats, notable for the swing necessary to take such a strong Conservative seat, gaining more than 60% of the votes cast and winning practically twice as many votes as the Conservatives. , the swing of 35.4% remains the sixth-largest by-election swing in British political history (the Bermondsey by-election in 1983 having the largest). It was also the largest swing (35%) against any British government since 1918.

At the time, it was not necessary for candidates in British elections to register party names or ballot paper descriptions. Details on candidates at this election are taken from the official count and David Boothroyd's election results site.

Results

See also
Lists of United Kingdom by-elections
Christchurch (UK Parliament constituency)

References

External links
British Parliamentary By Elections: Campaign literature from the by-election

1993 in England
1993 elections in the United Kingdom
Politics of Christchurch, Dorset
By-elections to the Parliament of the United Kingdom in Dorset constituencies
20th century in Dorset